Thomás Jaguaribe Bedinelli (born 24 February 1993), sometimes known as just Thomás, is a Brazilian professional footballer who plays as an attacking midfielder for South Korean K League 1 club Gwangju FC.

Career
Thomás' youth football career started with the Brazil club CFZ, then he went to the other hometown club Sport. He holds dual-citizenship and an Italian passport beside his Brazilian nationality. In 2006 Thomás arrived Italy to go through a trial period at Italian club Roma. After that he entered the youth team of Botafogo.

Flamengo
Thomás went into Flamengo's youth in 2008. In 2010, he became the champion of Campeonato Carioca de Juvenis with the team in an undefeated season and was the team's top scorer in the competition.

In 2011, selected by head coach Vanderlei Luxemburgo, Thomás entered Flamengo's senior squad, as well as earned his no. 25 jersey. He made his professional debut for Flamengo on 23 July 2011 against Ceará Sporting Club in Campeonato Brasileiro, and earned 9 appearances for Flamengo in Campeonato Brasileiro. In 2012, he changed his uniform to no. 20 and made 10 appearances in 2012 Campeonato Brasileiro season. On 16 March 2012, Thomás earned his first Copa Libertadores debut against Paraguayan club Olimpia Asunción at group stage, started the game and played 78 minutes. He played for Flamengo in 28 professional matches including 19 Campeonato Brasileiro appearances and nine more Campeonato Carioca games.

Siena (loan)
On 7 August 2013, Italian football club Siena announced that they made an agreement with Flamengo to loan Thomás for one year. He made 12 appearances for Siena in Serie B, as no. 10 of Siena. Then he came back to Brazil and re-registered into Flamengo's squad on 16 June 2014 but failed to get more opportunities under Vanderlei Luxemburgo.

Ponte Preta (loan)
On 19 August 2014, Globo reported that Campeonato Brasileiro Série B club Ponte Preta signed Thomás on loan from Flamengo until the end of season. Thomás made a total of 21 appearances for Ponte Preta, including 13 Série B matches in which he scored his only goal against Atlético Goianiense and 8 Campeonato Paulista matches. On 12 May 2015 he ended his loan and was back to Flamengo again.

Seattle Sounders (loan)
On 1 June 2015, the Major League Soccer club Seattle Sounders FC announced on their website that Thomás had finished his permanent transfer from Flamengo to the Sounders. Thomás made his debut for the Sounders on 7 June 2015, replacing Marco Pappa as a substitute on 80th minute during the road game against Sporting Kansas City which Sounders lost 0–1. On 15 August 2015 Thomás scored his first goal for the Sounders in their 4–0 win against Orlando City SC.

Joinville (loan)
During the 2015 offseason, Thomás was loaned to Joinville.

Other Brazilian Clubs
In January 2017 Santa Cruz signed Thomás.

On 1 June 2017, Thomás signed a one-year deal with Brazilian Série A club Sport, and after a year and half he signed as a free transfer with Brazilian Série B club Londrina.

Apollon Smyrnis
On 22 June 2018, Thomás signed a three-year deal with Super League club Apollon Smyrnis. On 16 December 2018, Thomás scored the only goal of the game in the 59th minute to clinch a long-awaited three-point haul for Babis Tennes’ team in a win game against Xanthi, who have now given their fans some hope in what has been a woeful campaign so far. It was the first win for the club in 2018–19 season in an ill-tempered Matchday 14 clash.

Atromitos

On 21 June 2021, Atromitos announced Thomás, having signed a two-year contract with the club.

Gwangju FC
For the 2023 season, Thomás has joined Gwangju FC of South Korean K League 1.

Career statistics

Honours

International
Brazil U-20
 8 Nations International Tournament: 2012

References

External links
 Thomás Jaguaribe in Brazil: the talent factory 2011
 Thomás Jaguaribe Bio Page on Seattle Sounders official website
 Thomás Bio Page on the Joinville Esporte Clube official website

1993 births
Living people
Association football midfielders
Brazilian footballers
Brazilian expatriate footballers
Campeonato Brasileiro Série A players
Campeonato Brasileiro Série B players
Serie B players
Major League Soccer players
Super League Greece players
Super League Greece 2 players
K League 1 players
CR Flamengo footballers
Associação Atlética Ponte Preta players
A.C.N. Siena 1904 players
Seattle Sounders FC players
Joinville Esporte Clube players
Santa Cruz Futebol Clube players
Sport Club do Recife players
Apollon Smyrnis F.C. players
Atromitos F.C. players
Associação Chapecoense de Futebol players
Gwangju FC players
Expatriate footballers in Italy
Expatriate soccer players in the United States
Expatriate footballers in South Korea